Vedat Erincin (born 1957, Istanbul) is a German actor of Turkish origin. The co-founder of the Wuppertal-based Wupper-Theater and former head of the Arkadaş Theater, he is dedicated to intercultural theatrical work. His former wife is fellow actress Lilay Huser.

Career 
Erincin came to Germany in 1978 and started a textile study here. In 1983 his first daughter, Pinar Erincin, was born. In addition, he had already directed plays in Turkish clubs. In 1986, he joined the ensemble of Arkadaş Theatre as a professional actor. In 1991, he was co-founder of the Wupper-Theater in Wuppertal, where he worked until 2003. Afterwards, he worked as an actor, director and children's theater author again at the Arkadaş Theatre and took over there, until 2006, the direction of the theater. He also participated in radio play as a speaker, among other things. He acted in the WDR production Fremde Heimat (1992) by Ismail Dogan and Nursel Köses Der Schlangenbrunnen (2000). Erincin also belonged to the ensemble of the premiere of Sema Merays Wegen der Ehre (2008).

In the German-Turkish film Almanya: Welcome to Germany, which was invited to the competition program of the Berlinale 2011, he took over the leading role of the Hüseyin. In the same year, he was nominated for a Deutscher Filmpreis for his supporting role as an enlightened Islamic cleric in Shahada.

Filmography (selection) 
 2008: 
 2010: Shahada
 2010: Wilsberg – Gefahr im Verzug
 2011: Almanya: Welcome to Germany
 2011: Franzi (TV series, episode: Sitar und Dudelsack)
 2011: Tatort – Der Weg ins Paradies
 2012: Brüder
 2012: Kuma
 2012: Alarm für Cobra 11: Gier
 2012: Auslandseinsatz
 2012: Leipzig Homicide: Gefrorenes Blut
 2012: Agent Ranjid rettet die Welt
 2013: Willkommen bei Habib
 2013: Wie Tag und Nacht
 2013: 
 2014: Lost in Karastan
 2015: 
 2015: Alarm für Cobra 11: Vendetta
 2016: Plötzlich Türke

References

External links
 
 Agentcy profile of Vedat Erincin

1957 births
Living people
German male actors
German people of Turkish descent
German theatre directors
Male actors from Istanbul
Turkish emigrants to Germany